Juni Wadsa (lit. Old Wadsa) also known as Wadsa gaon (lit. Wadsa village) is a village in the Wadsa taluka in Gadchiroli district in the state of Maharashtra, India. The town of "New Wadsa", now called Desaiganj  lies 2 km to the north-east. The village is situated on the banks of river Wainganga. 

The village lies on National Highway-353C and National Highway-543. The village is served by Wadsa railway station, which lies on Chanda Fort–Gondia section of South East Central Railway. The railway station is located in Desaiganj, 2 km to the north-east.

Marathi and Gondi languages are spoken here.

References

Wadsa
Talukas in Maharashtra